CIVETS is an acronym for six emerging market countries identified for their rapid economic development: Colombia, Indonesia, Vietnam, Egypt, Turkey, and South Africa. The term was coined in 2009 by Robert Ward of the Economist Intelligence Unit to describe nations demonstrating particularly strong growth potential. Common characteristics include "diverse and dynamic" economies, "young, growing population[s]", and "relatively sophisticated financial systems".

CIVETS is comparable to similar economic groupings such as BRICS and the Next Eleven, both devised by former Goldman Sachs economist Jim O'Neill to identify markets deemed most advantageous to investors. All three terms are examples of "acronym investing", in which investments are targeted to a group of otherwise disparate markets that share a common feature.

Etymology
The acronym CIVETS was first coined by Robert Ward, Global Director of the Global Forecasting Team of the Economist Intelligence Unit (EIU) in late 2009. The grouping was conceptually inspired by BRIC, a term developed in 2001 by Jim O'Neill of the American investment bank Goldman Sachs to describe four rapidly growing countries he believed would challenge the existing global economic order: Brazil, Russia, India, and China. Similarly, Ward identified CIVETS as having some of the strongest economic potential.

CIVETS was further disseminated and popularized by Michael Geoghegan, president of the British multinational bank HSBC, following a speech to the Hong Kong Chamber of Commerce in April 2010. Geoghegan compared these countries to the civet, a small cat-like omnivorous mammal that lives in tropical regions of Africa and Asia and eats and partially digests coffee cherries, passing a transformed coffee bean that is a highly valued commodity.

Characteristics
Though diverse in terms of geography, culture, and political system, CIVETS share several elements, most notably diversified economies and soaring young populations. Other similar aspects include relative political stability (particularly by historic standards), strong investment in infrastructure and higher education, reasonably sophisticated financial systems, comparatively low levels of public debt, and high overall economic growth.

Michael Geoghegan has called these countries "the new BRICS" because of their potential as second-generation emerging economies. In 2010, he stated that "emerging markets will grow three times as fast as developed countries this year", adding that the center of gravity of the world was moving towards the East and the South (Asia and Latin America).

In addition to being seen as attractive markets, the role of CIVETS countries in global governance is also discussed, especially at the G20, of which Indonesia, South Africa, and Turkey are members. All three nations are perceived as "development providers investing in peer-to-peer learning and horizontal partnerships and (...) are bound to become strategic players at the G20, UN and IFI levels". In view of this, during the 2011 annual meetings of the International Monetary Fund and the World Bank, the economy and finance ministers of the CIVETS countries established a formal mechanism for communication and coordination.

All CIVETS countries except Colombia and South Africa are also part of the "Next Eleven" (N-11), a group of nations that will purportedly become some of the world's largest economies in the 21st century.

Members

Colombia
Colombia is a member of the Pacific Alliance, the Andean Community, and the Association of Caribbean States. It was immersed in political repression since La Violencia. However, with the Constitution of 1991, the country finally reemerged democratically, though with severe obstacles from the Colombian conflict as well as political crises such as the Parapolitica scandal. In recent years, great strides forward have been made, with several institutional changes taking place. There are policies that favor the creation of new businesses, and foreigners can integrate into the market without major hurdles. Foreign investment increased five-fold between 2002 and 2010, and there has also been a petroleum and gas boom. The government is devising strategies to avoid Dutch disease as billions of dollars enter the country.

, Colombia has a budget deficit of 3.6%. The inflation rate is 2.6% and external debt a modest 47% of gross domestic product. Foreign investment is leading to noticeable improvements in infrastructure.

Today, Colombia's diversified economy is the third largest in Latin America, with macroeconomic stability and favorable long-term growth prospects.

Indonesia
Indonesia is a member of ASEAN. After emerging as the third-fastest-growing member of the G20 in 2009, Indonesia has been a strong performer. Like China and India, it is expanding rapidly. Investment growth in 2009 was boosted by infrastructure spending and high commodity prices.

The population of Indonesia is 243 million and it had a GDP of $834 billion in 2011. The budget deficit is 2.2% of GDP, and the current account is in surplus as of 2019.

Vietnam
Vietnam is a member of ASEAN. After the death of its leader Lê Duẩn in 1986, Vietnam began making the transition from a planned economy to a socialist-oriented market economy after suffering an inflation rate of 700% and a stagnant economy. The Communist Party launched a broad economic reform package called Doi Moi ("renewal"), with similarities to the Chinese model (economic openness mixed with communist politics) and achieving similar results. Between 1990 and 1997, Vietnam's economy grew at 8% per annum, with similar results in the following years.

Vietnam's rapid growth from the extreme poverty of 1986 has given rise to consumerist habits, especially among the new rich of Vietnam, opening the gap of social inequality and bringing inflation up to 12%, after it had recovered to 4%. However, Communist Party leaders are optimistic about maintaining the growth rate so that in 2020 it will be considered a newly industrialized country.

Egypt
In September 2011, the World Bank predicted growth of just 1% for that year, compared with 5.2% in the previous year, but analysts expected Egypt to regain its growth trajectory once political stability returned. Egypt has many assets, including fast-growing ports on the Mediterranean and Red Sea linked by the Suez Canal, a growing tourism network, and vast untapped natural gas reserves.  Egypt's 82 million population has a median age of 25.

Turkey
In 2011, Turkey had the world's 15th largest GDP-PPP and 18th largest Nominal GDP. The country is a founding member of the OECD (1961) and the G20 (1999). Since 31 December 1995, it has been part of the EU Customs Union. Mean wages were $8.71 per hour in 2009. Turkey grew at an average rate of 7.5 percent between 2002 and 2006, faster than any other OECD country. Over the past 20 years, Turkey has made significant improvements in economic freedoms. It has expanded monetary freedom, freedom from corruption, and fiscal freedom; these advancements have, nevertheless, been undermined by Turkey's deteriorating property rights and financial freedom.

According to a survey by Forbes magazine, Istanbul, Turkey's financial capital, had a total of 28 billionaires as of March 2010 (down from 34 in 2008), ranking fourth in the world behind New York City (60 billionaires), Moscow (50 billionaires), and London (32 billionaires). In 2012, Istanbul ranked 5th in the world with 30 billionaires, behind Moscow (78 billionaires), New York City (57 billionaires), London (39 billionaires), and Hong Kong (38 billionaires). Turkey's major cities and its Aegean coastline attract millions of visitors every year.

The CIA classifies Turkey as a developed country. It is often classified as a newly industrialized country by economists and political scientists.

Economic data

Challenges and criticisms
All CIVETS members share similar challenges to sustained economic growth, including unemployment, corruption, inequality, and susceptibility to market volatility. The grouping has also been criticized for lacking economic rigor, serving as a "marketing ploy" intended to assuage investors' reluctance to invest in less developed or stable economies. Richard Titherington, chief investment officer of emerging equities at JP Morgan Chase, dismissed the concept of acronym investments generally, noting that many countries that are grouped together have little in common. Detractors claim that such groupings "do not take into account different stages of development of the countries involved and risk sidelining other promising markets."

In 2013, HSBC closed its CIVETS fund, which was identified by some analysts as indicative of the grouping's underperformance.

See also
 Emerging markets
 List of country groupings
 List of multilateral free-trade agreements
 VISTA

References

2000s economic history
Economic country classifications